Susan Eileen McDonald (born 7 February 1970) is an Australian politician who has been a Senator for Queensland since 2019. She is a member of the Liberal National Party of Queensland (LNP) and sits with the National Party in federal parliament. She has a background in agribusiness.

Early life
McDonald was born in Brisbane. Her father Don McDonald served as state and federal president of the National Party during the 1990s.

McDonald grew up on Devoncourt Station, located in the locality of Kuridala outside of Cloncurry. She began her schooling through the School of the Air based in Mount Isa before boarding at Stuartholme School in Brisbane. She later completed the degrees of Bachelor of Commerce and Bachelor of Economics from the University of Queensland.

Career
McDonald is a chartered accountant. From 2014 to 2019 she served as managing director of Super Butcher, a subsidiary of her family business MDH which had five stores and employed 80 people as of 2016. She was appointed to the board of Beef Australia in 2016. She joined the council of the Royal National Agricultural and Industrial Association of Queensland in the same year.

Politics
McDonald joined the National Party of Queensland at the age of 19. She served a term as state secretary beginning in 2003. When the party merged with the state Liberal Party in 2008, she became a founding trustee of the new Liberal National Party of Queensland (LNP). She served as chief of staff to Andrew Cripps, the Queensland Minister for Natural Resources and Mines from 2012 to 2015.

Senate
In July 2018 McDonald won LNP preselection for the Senate. She was elected to parliament at the 2019 federal election, to a term beginning on 1 July 2019, and sits in the Nationals partyroom. She serves on several Senate committees and is the chair of the rural and regional affairs and transport legislation committee.

McDonald reportedly voted for Barnaby Joyce in the 2021 Nationals leadership spill, despite having previously supported Michael McCormack. She was subsequently appointed as the Morrison Government's Special Envoy for Northern Australia, a non-ministerial position.

During her time in 2021 the senate, McDonald supported an inquiry into Vegan Food label.

Following the Coalition's defeat at the 2022 federal election, McDonald was appointed to new opposition leader Peter Dutton's shadow ministry, with responsibility for the resources and Northern Australia portfolios.

Political views
McDonald advocates the agricultural development of inland Australia. She has endorsed the assumptions of the Bradfield Scheme and supports the construction of the Hell's Gate Dam on the upper Burdekin River as well as the expansion of the existing Burdekin Dam. In March 2019 The Australian described her as "avowedly pro-coal".

McDonald has nominated Lawrence Springborg, Tim Fischer and Joh Bjelke-Petersen as political role models.

Personal life
McDonald is a single mother to three children. She moved to Townsville after her election to parliament, having previously lived in the Brisbane suburb of Clayfield.

McDonald was diagnosed with COVID-19 in March 2020. She was only the third North Queenslander to contract the virus. She described it as a "mild case" and said she was unsure how she became infected.

References

National Party of Australia members of the Parliament of Australia
Members of the Australian Senate for Queensland
Living people
Women members of the Australian Senate
Liberal National Party of Queensland politicians
People from Cloncurry, Queensland
21st-century Australian women politicians
21st-century Australian politicians
1970 births
Australian food industry businesspeople
University of Queensland alumni
Australian accountants